The Drosophila elegans species subgroup contains 3 species. The subgroup belongs to the Drosophila melanogaster species group within the subgenus Sophophora.

Phylogeny 

melanogaster complex, elegans subgroup:
 D. (S.) elegans
 D. (S.) gunungcola
 D. (S.) subelegans

References 

 J. A. Coyne, S. Elwyn, S. Y. Kim & A. Llopart 2004. Genetic studies of two sister species in the Drosophila melanogaster subgroup, D. yakuba and D. santomea. Genetical Research 84: 11-26.

External links 
 Drosophila elegans species subgroup at NCBI

elegans species subgroup
Insect species groups